Omer Nachmani (born 29 October 1993) is a former Israeli footballer.

Club career

Beitar Jerusalem
Nachmani played from the age of 12 with Beitar Jerusalem Youth, playing his first match for the club with Beitar Jerusalem Gadi (the U-15 squad) on 30 September 2006. The following week he scored his first goal for the club giving Beitar Jerusalem the only goal in the Jerusalem derby against Hapoel Jerusalem Youth.

Nachmani debuted for the senior team on 25 August 2012 in a 3–2 loss to Ironi Kiryat Shmona, playing the first 75 minutes.

Maccabi Herzliya
For the 2013–14 season Nachmani was loaned out to Maccabi Herzliya of the Liga Leumit. He debuted for them in a 0–0 draw against Hapoel Petah Tikva on 20 September 2013, being substituted on in the 67th minute. During the whole season Nachmani played 13 matches, scoring 1 goal.

Notes

1993 births
Living people
Israeli footballers
Beitar Jerusalem F.C. players
Maccabi Herzliya F.C. players
Israeli Premier League players
Liga Leumit players
Footballers from Jerusalem
Association football midfielders